The following is a complete list of presidents of Eastern Michigan University. This list includes previous presidents under the school's past names Eastern Michigan College, Michigan State Normal College, and Michigan State Normal School.  Prior to the Normal School's elevation to collegiate status, presidents were called "Principal."

A total of 26 people have served as the president: 24 men (including three interim appointments) and 2 women (including one interim appointment).

List of presidents

Notes

Eastern Michigan University
Eastern Michigan University presidents